The 2022 FK Bodø/Glimt season is the club's 106th season in its existence and the fifth consecutive season in the Eliteserien. In addition to the domestic season, Bodø/Glimt are participating in the Norwegian Cup and the UEFA Europa League.

Players

Squad

Out on loan

Pre-season and friendlies

Competitions

Overall record

Eliteserien

League table

Results summary

Results by round

Matches

Norwegian Football Cup

UEFA Champions League

First qualifying round 
The draw for the second qualifying round was held on 14 June 2022.

Second qualifying round 
The draw for the second qualifying round was held on 15 June 2022.

Third qualifying round 
The draw for the third qualifying round was held on 18 July 2022.

Play-off round 
The draw for the play-off round was held on 2 August 2022.

UEFA Europa League

Group stage 

The draw for the group stage was held on 26 August 2022.

Notes

References 

FK Bodø/Glimt seasons
Bodø/Glimt